Parfait (meaning "perfect") is either of two types of dessert. In France, where the dish originated, parfait is made by boiling cream, egg, sugar and syrup to create a custard-like puree. The American version  consists of layers differentiated by the inclusion of such ingredients as granola, nuts, yogurt and liqueurs, topped off with fruits or whipped cream. The oldest known recipe dates back to 1894.

Either type is typically served in tall glassware together with a long spoon known as parfait spoon. The classical parfait glass is stemware, with a short stem and a tall slender bowl, often tapered towards the  bottom, also used for serving milkshakes. In South Asia (particularly Bangladesh), parfaits are made in bowl containers, rather than tall glasses.

France
In France, parfait refers to a frozen dessert made from a base of sugar syrup, egg, and cream. A parfait contains enough fat, sugar, alcohol, and to a lesser extent, air, to allow it to be made by stirring infrequently while freezing, making it possible to create in a home kitchen without specialist equipment. The fat, sugar, alcohol or air interferes with the formation of water crystals, which would otherwise give the ice cream an uncomfortable texture in the mouth. The formation of ice crystals is managed in the making of regular ice cream by agitating the ice cream constantly while it freezes or chemically by adding glycerol. Neither should be necessary when making a high-quality parfait.

United Kingdom
In the United Kingdom, parfait can refer to a very smooth meat paste (or pâté), usually made from liver (chicken or duck) and sweetened with liqueurs.

United States and Canada
In the United States, parfait refers to either the traditional French-style dessert or to a popular variant, the American parfait, made by layering parfait cream, ice cream, and sometimes fruit. It is  usually served in a tall clear glass, but can also be served in a short and stubby glass. The clear glass allows the layers of the dessert to be seen. A topping is usually created with whipped cream, fresh or canned fruit, or liqueurs.

Recent trends in the United States and Canada have introduced parfaits without cream or liqueurs.  These are made by simply layering yogurt with granola, nuts, and/or fresh fruits (such as peaches, strawberries, or blueberries).  This version is sometimes called a yogurt parfait or fruit parfait.

See also
 Semifreddo
 Sundae
 List of custard desserts
 List of French desserts

References

External links
 Allrecipes.com: Parfait Recipes

Sundaes
Yogurt-based dishes
French desserts